Emil Hirschfeld (31 July 1903 – 23 February 1968) was a German athlete who won a bronze medal in the shot put at the 1928 Olympics. The same year he set two world records in this event. At the 1932 Summer Olympics he finished fourth in the shot put and 14th in the discus throw.

References

1903 births
1968 deaths
Sportspeople from Gdańsk
German male shot putters
German male discus throwers
Olympic bronze medalists for Germany
Athletes (track and field) at the 1928 Summer Olympics
Athletes (track and field) at the 1932 Summer Olympics
Olympic athletes of Germany
World record setters in athletics (track and field)
People from West Prussia
Medalists at the 1928 Summer Olympics
Olympic bronze medalists in athletics (track and field)